Canel's–Zerouno is a professional men's cycling team based in Mexico and founded in 2012, which competes in elite road bicycle racing events under UCI Continental rules. The team takes its name from its main sponsors – Mexican confectionery company Canel's and Italian bicycle manufacturer Zerouno.

Team roster

Major results

2014
Stage 6 Vuelta a Guatemala, Francisco Colorado
2015
Overall Vuelta Mexico Telmex, Francisco Colorado
2016
Stage 5 Vuelta a Guatemala, Román Villalobos
Stages 5 & 6 (ITT) Vuelta Popular a Costa Rica , Román Villalobos
2017
Mexican National Road Race Championships, Efrén Santos
Stage 1 Vuelta Ciclista Internacional a Costa Rica, Efrén Santos
Stage 8 Vuelta Ciclista Internacional a Costa Rica, Eduardo Corte
2018
Stage 2 Vuelta a San Juan, Román Villalobos
Stage 1 Tour of the Gila, Óscar Eduardo Sánchez
Stage 1 Vuelta Internacional Ciclista Michoacan, Román Villalobos
Stage 5 Vuelta Internacional Ciclista Michoacan, Óscar Eduardo Sánchez
Stage 6 Vuelta Internacional Ciclista Michoacan, Ignacio Prado
2019
Stage 3 Vuelta Ciclista de Chile, Pablo Alarcón
Stage 1 Grand Prix Cycliste de Saguenay, Efrén Santos
Stage 3b Tour de Beauce, Pablo Alarcón
2020
Mexican National Time Trial Championships, Ignacio Prado
2021
Mexican National Time Trial Championships, Ignacio Prado

References

External links

Cycling teams based in Mexico
2012 establishments in Mexico